Jedburgh television relay station is a relay transmitter of Selkirk, covering the town of Jedburgh. It is owned and operated by Arqiva.

Services listed by frequency

Analogue television
These services were closed down on 20 November 2008. BBC2 Scotland was previously closed on 6 November.

Digital television
BBC A began broadcasting on 6 November 2008, Digital 3&4 on 20 November 2008, and BBC B on 30 November 2010.

External links
Jedburgh at The Transmission Gallery

Transmitter sites in Scotland